Callahan Michael Burke (born March 24, 1997) is an American professional ice hockey forward currently playing for the Colorado Eagles in the American Hockey League (AHL) as a prospect to the Colorado Avalanche of the National Hockey League (NHL).

Playing career

Amateur
Burke as a youth attended Noble and Greenough School, in Dedham, Massachusetts, and played three seasons from 2011–14, serving as team captain in the 2013–14 season to total 89 points through 83 games. Having been drafted by the Cedar Rapids RoughRiders, 50th overall, in the United States Hockey League (USHL) 2013 Futures Draft, he joined the RoughRiders following completion of his tenure with Noble and Greenough and appeared in 5 games to end the 2013–14 season. 

In his first full season in the USHL in 2014–15, Burke collected 20 goals and 40 points through 60 games. He returned for a second season in 2015–16, serving as team captain in contributing with 14 goals and 25 assists for 39 points in 56 games, placing fourth on the team in scoring.

Committing to a collegiate career with the Notre Dame Fighting Irish, Burke as a freshman played the 2016–17 season in a depth forward role and added 3 goals and 11 points in 35 games before he was injured in game one of the Hockey East quarterfinals series against Providence College. 

With the Fighting Irish moving to the Big Ten Conference for the 2017–18 season, Burke as a sophomore was given an increased offensive role and responded by totalling a career best 14 goals for 26 points through 38 games. On December 9, 2017, he posted his  first career hat-trick and led the Irish to a 6-2 win over the University of Wisconsin, marking the first hat-trick for Notre Dame since Steven Fogarty in 2015. Helping Notre Dame advance to the Frozen Four, Burke scored a goal against the University of Michigan resulting in a berth to the National Championship game. 

In the 2018–19 season, Burke recorded a career best 30 points and as a junior tied for the team lead in goals with 12. In claiming a second consecutive Big Ten Championships and reaching the Frozen Four, he was a recipient of the B1G Sportsmanship award. 

Approaching his final and senior season in 2019–20, Callahan's leadership within the Fighting Irish was recognized as he was selected to serve as Notre Dame's team captain. He made 37 appearances and tallied 7 goals and 14 assists for 21 points. He concluded his collegiate career earning a second consecutive B1G Sportsmanship Award and was named to the Lowes Senior Class All-American First Team.

Professional
As an undrafted free agent, Burke embarked on his professional career by signing a one-year contract with the Colorado Eagles of the American Hockey League (AHL), the primary affiliate to the Colorado Avalanche on March 18, 2020. With the 2020–21 season, delayed due to the COVID-19 pandemic, Burke made professional debut, registering an assist, in a 3-2 defeat to the San Diego Gulls on February 13, 2021. He later notched his first professional goal with the Eagles against the Bakersfield Condors on April 13, 2021. In showing capability as a two-way checking forward, Burke completed his rookie year with the Eagles in registering 2 goals and 9 points in 33 regular season games. He tallied an assist in 2 post-season games in the Pacific Divisional playoffs.

On June 17, 2021, Burke was signed to a one-year contract extension to continue his tenure with the Eagles. In the following 2021–22 season, Burke increased his offensive output, registering 14 points through his first 19 games with the Eagles to earn a one-year NHL contract with parent club, the Colorado Avalanche, on December 16, 2021. Remaining on assignment with the Eagles, Burke finished his second professional season in posting 26 points through 57 regular season games.

As a restricted free agent, Burke was signed to a one-year, two-way contract extension with the reigning Stanley Cup champion Avalanche on July 20, 2022. After attending Colorado's 2022 training camp, Burke was re-assigned to begin the  season with the Eagles. In his third season with the Eagles, Burke posted 11 points through 21 games before he received his first recall to the NHL by the injury-plagued Avalanche on December 6, 2022. He made his NHL debut the following day, featuring on the fourth-line for the depleted Avalanche, in a 4-0 shutout defeat to his boyhood club, the Boston Bruins.

Personal
Burke is the son of Sharon and Garrett Burke, his father played collegiately with the University of Massachusetts-Lowell from 1988–1990.  He has two younger brothers, Cam and C.J., with Cam also playing collegiate hockey with the Fighting Irish before transferring to Boston College for the 2022–23 season. 

He originally graduated from Washington High School in Cedar Rapids, Iowa, and majored in Business Analytics during his tenure with Notre Dame.

Career statistics

Awards and honors

References

External links
 

1997 births
Living people
Cedar Rapids RoughRiders players
Colorado Avalanche players
Colorado Eagles players
Notre Dame Fighting Irish men's ice hockey players
Undrafted National Hockey League players